Chir (also Romanized as Chīr; also known as Deh Chīr) is a village in Jowzar Rural District, in the Central District of Mamasani County, Fars Province, Iran. At the 2006 census, its population was 75, in 25 families.

References 

Populated places in Mamasani County